Swedish singer and songwriter Tove Lo has written over 70 songs for her four studio albums and one extended play, as well as for other artists. Between 2006 and 2009, Lo was a member of math rock band Tremblebee, and wrote the lyrics for their songs. In 2011, she signed a publishing deal with Warner/Chappell Music, and later joined songwriting teams Xenomania and Wolf Cousins. In 2014, Lo wrote and provided vocals for "Heroes (We Could Be)" by Swedish musician Alesso, which peaked inside the top ten in Sweden and the United Kingdom. 
Lo co-wrote "Love Me Like You Do", recorded by English singer Ellie Goulding, which was released as the second single from the soundtrack to the film Fifty Shades of Grey (2015). The track topped the UK Singles Chart and peaked at number three on the Billboard Hot 100. Additionally, Lo received nominations, alongside the others co-writers of the song, for the Golden Globes, Grammys and Critics' Choice Awards.  Discussing the process of writing for other artists, the singer told Paste that she avoids drawing from her own experiences so that the songs do not become personal. She also stated: "My main goal is to say something how they would say it, even if I might say it in a different way that makes more sense to me".

In addition to her work for other artists, Lo has co-written the songs from her own record releases. While writing for other singers, she started to record the songs she deemed too personal to give away; the first one was "Love Ballad", which was initially offered to an artist who wanted to change the lyrics. The track became her first collaboration with co-writers Jakob Jerlström and Ludvig Söderberg, better known as The Struts, and was later released as Lo's debut single in October 2012. "Habits", also co-written with The Struts, was released as the singer's second single in March 2013. It was written during 2012's Hurricane Sandy in New York, and was inspired by Lo's attempts to forget a former boyfriend through substance abuse and other hedonistic practices. Its popularity among music blogs gained the artist a recording contract with Universal Music Group.

In March 2014, Lo released her first EP Truth Serum, a concept record that details her "most intense" failed relationship. It contains six tracks co-written by the singer alongside The Struts and Alx Reuterskiöld, among others. In September of that year, the artist released her debut studio album, Queen of the Clouds, a concept album divided into three sections that describes the pattern of her relationships: The Sex, The Love and The Pain. The majority of the tracks were co-written by Lo alongside The Struts. "Habits" was re-released as "Habits (Stay High)" as both the second single from Truth Serum and the lead single from Queen of the Clouds, and became a commercial success, peaking at number three on the Billboard Hot 100. It was also awarded the Song of the Year accolade at the 2015 Grammis Awards in Sweden.

In October 2016, Lo released her second studio album, Lady Wood, which talks about "different kinds of rushes in life" and is divided into two chapters, "Fairy Dust" and "Fire Fade". It featured ten songs co-written by the artist alongside The Struts, Ilya Salmanzadeh and Oscar Holter, among others. In November 2017, the singer released her third studio album, Blue Lips, which is a sequel to Lady Wood and is also split into two chapters: "Light Beams" and "Pitch Black". For the record, she worked mostly with The Struts and Ali Payami. Lo has also written and recorded tracks for the soundtracks of three films. She solely wrote and produced "Scream My Name" for the soundtrack to the 2014 film The Hunger Games: Mockingjay – Part 1. She wrote "Scars" alongside The Struts, which became the lead single of the soundtrack to the 2016 film The Divergent Series: Allegiant. Lo also co-wrote "Lies in the Dark", which is part of the soundtrack to Fifty Shades Darker (2017).

Songs

References

External links
 Tove Lo repertory on the American Society of Composers, Authors and Publishers (ASCAP)
 Tove Lo repertory on Warner/Chappell Music
 Tove Lo repertory on Broadcast Music, Inc. (BMI)

Lists of songs by songwriters